American actor, film producer, and martial artist Wesley Snipes started his acting career in the 1980s with a one episode appearance on the soap opera All My Children (1984). His first film roles were both in 1986 in Wildcats and Streets of Gold. He then appeared as Willie Mays Hayes in the 1989 sports comedy film Major League with Tom Berenger and Charlie Sheen. He had prominent roles in the 1990s, starring in the films New Jack City with Ice-T (1991), White Men Can't Jump with Woody Harrelson (1992), Rising Sun with Sean Connery (1993), Demolition Man with Sylvester Stallone (1993), To Wong Foo, Thanks for Everything! Julie Newmar with Patrick Swayze and John Leguizamo (1995), and U.S. Marshals with Tommy Lee Jones (1998). Also in 1998, he was cast as Eric Brooks / Blade in the superhero horror film Blade, based on the Marvel Comics superhero of the same name, a role he went on to reprise in Blade II (2002) and Blade: Trinity (2004).

Snipes had smaller roles during the 2000s, most of them being direct-to-video before returning to the theatrical release, cast as Doctor "Doc" Death in the 2014 action film The Expendables 3 where he was reunited working with Sylvester Stallone. He teamed up with Eddie Murphy to co-star in the biographical comedy film Dolemite Is My Name as D'Urville Martin (2019) and the comedy film Coming 2 America as General Izzi (2021).

His television work includes multiple episodes in drama series H.E.L.P. (1990), action thriller crime drama series The Player (2015), and drama limited series True Story opposite Kevin Hart (2021).

Film

Television

Theatre

Music videos

Soundtrack appearances

Video games

References

External links 

 

Male actor filmographies
American filmographies